Classic country is a music radio format that specializes in playing mainstream country and western music hits from past decades.

Repertoire
The radio format specializes in hits from the 1950s through the 1980s, and focus primarily on innovators and artists from country music's Golden Age, including Hank Williams, Patsy Cline, George Jones, Kitty Wells, Charley Pride, Tammy Wynette, Johnny Cash, Waylon Jennings, Willie Nelson, Johnny Paycheck, Kenny Rogers, Emmylou Harris, and Merle Haggard, along with English and Spanglish language songs from 1960s to 2000s Tejano and New Mexico music artists like Freddy Fender, Johnny Rodriguez, Little Joe, Freddie Brown, and Al Hurricane. It can also include recurrent 1980s to 2000s hits from neotraditional country and honky-tonk artists such as George Strait, Reba McEntire, Toby Keith, Alan Jackson, and Randy Travis.

History
The format resulted largely from changes in the sound of country music in the late 1980s and the early 1990s, as it began moving to FM radio stations in and around major cities and absorbing some of the electric sound of rock music; similar pressures also were a factor in the development of the Americana format at around the same time. These new FM country stations excluded older "classic" country artists from their playlists, despite the fact that artists, such as Merle Haggard, George Jones, Dolly Parton, Willie Nelson, Kenny Rogers and Emmylou Harris, were still actively performing and releasing new recordings, some of which were significant hits.  When mainstream country radio began this practice in the mid-1990s, a large segment of older country fans felt alienated and turned away from mainstream country. Whereas modern country began moving to FM around this time, classic country remained (and still remains) one of the few formats that has proven ideal for AM radio, particularly in rural areas; prior to this transition, country was primarily an AM radio phenomenon and was most widely popular in rural areas.

In 1998, Robert Unmacht, editor of the M Street Journal, said that thirty stations around the United States had switched to the format because many longtime country fans did not like what country radio was doing.

The same practice has seemed to follow to television, where Country Music Television and Great American Country rarely play any music videos produced before 1996, leaving heritage and "classic" artists to networks such as RFD-TV, which features a heavy complement of older programming such as Pop! Goes the Country, Porter Wagoner's programs and The Wilburn Brothers Show, along with newer performances from heritage acts. CMT Pure Country, the all-music counterpart to CMT, relegated its classic country programming to a daily half-hour block known as "Pure Vintage" before abandoning classic country altogether by 2015. (Complicating matters somewhat is a relative lack of music videos for country music songs prior to the 1980s.)

Classic country remains a popular block format on mainstream country stations, usually on weekends.

Related formats
As is the case with rock music (where classic rock, mainstream rock, and active rock all have varying amounts of older music), country music stations also can vary in the amount of "classic" content in their playlist, and formats exist for such stations. In addition to pure "classic country" stations, which play little to no current or recurrent country hits (i.e., recorded after about 2010), country music-formatted stations tend to fall under one of these formats:

 Traditional country: Primarily plays classic country but also plays newer country songs. Some traditional country stations feature a gold-based direction, drawing from country acts that were active in the 1990s and early 2000s (including new material and recurrents), and avoiding modern pop-influenced or "bro-country" songs.
 Adult country: Typified by the Nash Icon national format, adult country (there is no generally accepted name for the format) has a music set newer than a classic or traditional country station (almost never playing songs from before 1980) but not as reliant on current hits as a mainstream or hot country station. Such stations are more willing to play pop-oriented songs than classic or traditional country outlets. Nash Icon describes the format as an analogy: it is to country as adult contemporary is to top-40.
 Mainstream country (or modern country): The most common country music format. Unlike traditional country, mainstream country is generally bound to a top 40 chart for the majority of its playlist, but the format allows stations to fill out the remaining playlists with a mix of classic and recent recurrent songs. In the context of the music industry, "country radio" is largely driven by mainstream country stations.
 Hot country: Focuses exclusively on top 40 country music and – with the exception of a small number of recurrent hits no older than two or three years old – plays very little, if any, older music. Hot country stations may also include non-country pop songs in their rotation.
 A late-2010s format known as "The Wow Factor" attempted to cross the adult country format with classic hits. Its juxtaposition of country and pop bore similarity to the adult hits format. By 2020, The Wow Factor had largely cut its country titles.
 Americana: A more recent and emerging format which plays more Modern "Authentic Country music" that often plays music from the modern country subgenres of Americana and Alt-Country, along with roots music. Classic Country is also common on these stations and are often from the Honky Tonk, Hillbilly, Bluegrass, Western Swing, Bakersfield sound, and Outlaw Country subgenres. The station musical libraries usually varies from station to station as some stations might add in a few rock and mainstream country artists that have a more traditional country influence. This type of station format is the biggest in Texas with Texas Country/Red Dirt music radio (with examples being KFWR and KHYI), this format is also popular online and for shows on public radio and college radio stations.

Dividing line
With a few exceptions, the classic country genre has struggled as a radio format (unlike mainstream country stations). While it has a fiercely loyal audience, classic country stations often struggle to find advertisers. While advertisers are primarily interested in the 18 to 49-year-old demographic age group, classic country usually attracts an older audience. For perhaps that reason, country music fans are often (stereotypically) divided into two camps:
 The younger country music fan (with the exception of the Americana roots music fans), especially if he or she is younger than 30 years old, who is largely unfamiliar with the older country music sounds, especially from the 1980s and earlier, and will find earlier pre-1960s "hillbilly" music (such as that by Hank Williams and Kitty Wells) and its unpolished, Appalachian influences over-the-top and unlistenable.
 The classic country fan, frequently over the age of 50, who—with a few exceptions—often dislikes country music produced after 1990, when the genre began incorporating more rock influence. Such fans often bemoan the electrification of popular country music with the addition of heavier guitars, Hard Rock influenced voices and harder percussion (for example, the music of Brantley Gilbert and some of Jason Aldean's discography), and in more recent years even hip hop influences. Other complaints from this era include the increased cliché-driven songwriting ("Achy Breaky Heart" by Billy Ray Cyrus, one of the biggest country hits of the 1990s, was notorious in this respect, as was the fad of bro-country in the early 2010s) and, although pop/country crossover complaints have occurred since even the late 1940s with artists such as Eddy Arnold and Elvis Presley, the marketing of pop songs with little or even no country influence as "country" songs solely because the artists have previously performed country songs (something Billboard eventually confessed in 2019; modern examples of this include Taylor Swift and Carrie Underwood).

The 1990 dividing line coincided with a change in Billboard magazine's rules for what was then the Hot Country Singles record chart. Prior to 1990, it had operated under a variant of the methods used to produce the Hot 100; singles sales were combined with radio airplay to rank songs on the chart. In 1990, through an affiliation with Nielsen Broadcast Data Systems, Billboard dropped record sales from the formula, basing a song's ranking solely on spins on country radio, weighted by a station's listenership. (The formula reincorporated singles sales, both physical and digital, in 2012, but included airplay on non-country stations, thus giving pop-crossover singles a major advantage.) The 1990 change had quick effects: a number of musicians who had had consistent success on the chart through the late 1980s suddenly dropped out of the top-40 by 1991.

Although this 1990-era dividing line, to a certain extent, exists, it is not necessarily universal. "Classic" era country artists such as Kenny Rogers, Willie Nelson and Dolly Parton continued producing hits well into the 2000s that received mainstream country radio airplay (sometimes in collaborations). Other artists from the era that did not continue to receive wider radio airplay after their heyday maintained strong cult followings from fans of all ages; an example of this is Johnny Cash, who remains in high regard many years after his 2003 death. Artists that began their careers in the 1980s, near the dividing line of the classic/modern divide, enjoy followings among both audiences; examples include George Strait and Reba McEntire, both of whom (as of 2014) are still active and performing hit songs. Neotraditional country, a style of country that arose in the 1980s, continues to produce hit songs and artists that draw from the sounds of the classic country era.

In part due to changing demographic pressures, "classic country" radio programs have begun adding 1990s music into their playlists since the late 2000s and phasing out music from the early 1960s and earlier.  As children who grew up between 2000 and 2009 are becoming adults, some classic country radio stations play country music from the 2000s, with 1970s music increasingly being de-emphasized.  Examples of this are KLBL in Malvern, Arkansas, the now-defunct WAGL in Portville, New York (which brands itself as "country throwbacks" instead of classic country) KMJX in Conway, Arkansas. Some classic country stations have also been adding songs from the 2010s that appeal to this audience such as Jake Owen's "Barefoot Blue Jean Night" and Gary Allan's "Every Storm (Runs Out of Rain)". This is not universal, as a limited number of AM radio stations still emphasize the earlier, pre-1980s country cuts; WRVK in Mount Vernon, Kentucky and KWMT in Fort Dodge, Iowa being prominent examples.

Syndicated radio programs
The Country Oldies Show - Three-hour weekend show, also available stripped as hourlong daily shows, hosted by Steve Warren. Music aired is from the 1950s through the 1980s.
Country Music Greats Radio Show - Two-hour weekend show, also available stripped, hosted by Jim Ed Brown until his 2015 death and since that time by Nashville radio personality Bill Cody.
Country Gold - Four-hour weekend show hosted by Terri Clark on Westwood One. Music aired is from the 1970s through the 1990s. Show traces its history to Westwood One's Country Gold Saturday Night, a live five-hour request show that launched in the early 1990s, although most of the series no longer resembles its original format. (The original format now airs as The Original Country Gold on Compass Media Networks, hosted by former Country Gold host Rowdy Yates.)
Classic Country Today - Two-hour weekend show, hosted by Keith Bilbrey.
 Weekend In The Country - Two-hour weekend show, hosted by Craig Orndorff.
Rick Jackson's Country Classics - Three-hour weekend show, hosted by Rick Jackson on United Stations Radio Networks.
Country Flashback- Three-hour weekend show that debuted in 1991, hosted by Rich Renik from Starliner Media

References

External links

 Country Flashback Website

 http://listen.radionomy.com/allcountrylegends.m3u All Country Legends webradio with country classic 24/7.
Real Country Online From Citadel Media (formerly ABC Radio Network), a 24-hour satellite-fed format of traditional country music.
Classic Country Revival Facebook Page

American styles of music

Radio formats